Anthony O'Donnell may refer to:

 Anthony O'Donnell (actor), Welsh actor
 Tony O'Donnell (politician) (born 1961), American politician in the Maryland House of Delegates